Strange Glacier is a glacier in the Latady Mountains, draining southeast along the south side of Crain Ridge to enter Gardner Inlet between Schmitt Mesa and Mount Austin, in Palmer Land. Mapped by United States Geological Survey (USGS) from surveys and U.S. Navy air photos, 1961–67. Named by Advisory Committee on Antarctic Names (US-ACAN) for Donald L. Strange, hospital corpsman at South Pole Station in 1964.

Glaciers of Palmer Land